Aminopentane may refer to:

 1-Aminopentane
 2-Aminopentane
 3-Aminopentane